is a maze video game developed by Nintendo and Intelligent Systems and published by Nintendo for the Nintendo Entertainment System. It was released for the Famicom in Japan on October 5, 1984, and for the Nintendo Entertainment System in Europe on July 15, 1987. It was re-released on the Wii's Virtual Console in Japan on January 22, 2008, and in PAL regions on October 31, 2008. Due to Nintendo of America having policies over the use of religious icons in games, it was not released in North America. It is Shigeru Miyamoto's first console-only game after a legacy of arcade development, and his only game not to be localized to North America.

Gameplay 

Devil World is a Pac-Man-styled maze game in which  player 1 controls Tamagon, a green dragon who decides to "attack the Devil's World", along with a red player 2 version of him. He navigates through a series of mazes patrolled by monsters, and touches Crosses to power up and summon the ability to breathe fire and eat the dots in the maze. Without a cross, he is completely helpless, and cannot complete the maze. The large winged demon simply called "the Devil" dances at the top of the screen, and will point in a direction for four of his minions to move the maze by using pulleys and ropes. This can be dangerous, as Tamagon can be squished by getting caught between a maze wall and the moving outer boundary. After the first maze is cleared, the next objective is to get four Bibles, and put them into a seal. The Bibles give Tamagon the same powers as with the Crosses. After carrying them all into the seal, the Devil flies to the next maze. In between, a bonus maze shows up where Tamagon collects six Bonus Boxes under a time limit.

Development 
Devil World was designed by Shigeru Miyamoto and Takashi Tezuka, and directed by Miyamoto as his first console-only game. The game provided Tezuka's first project when he joined Nintendo full-time. Initially, Tezuka did not know of Pac-Man at that time, a game that Devil World resembles, but enjoyed the game when he played it for the first time. Among Tezuka's tasks then was to create pixelated images based on Miyamoto's instructions. During the development, Tezuka suggested holes the player's character would fall into, causing him to lose a turn. However, when they made a version to test his idea and tried it out, Tezuka was told that it is "a bit flat", and so they went back to the original feature of the character being squished against the walls. The duo flew to Nintendo of America to show Devil World to its president Minoru Arakawa, but he did not wish to release the game in North America due to the company (at the time) having policies over the use of religious icons in Devil World.

Reception 
Chris Kohler called Devil World "a typically ingenious Miyamoto-directed take on the maze genre, with inventive graphics and fun game play" which "absolutely could not be released in America" because its satanic and religious imagery "would be seen as unsettling or even blasphemous". On IGN's "Top 10 Pac-Man Clones", Devil World was ranked fourth. Eurogamer rated the Virtual Console release 7 out of 10 points. The reviewer stated that Devil World is "worth experiencing just for the bizarre nature of the concept", but also commented that its "abundance of ideas ultimately get in the way of the simple gameplay".

Notes

References

External links 
Official Virtual Console version website 
Devil World at NinDB

1984 video games
Nintendo Entertainment System games
Nintendo games
Nintendo Research & Development 1 games
Maze games
Video games designed by Shigeru Miyamoto
Video games developed in Japan
Video games scored by Akito Nakatsuka
Video games scored by Koji Kondo
Virtual Console games
Virtual Console games for Wii U